The Clockwork Woman is the 3rd in the series of Time Hunter novellas and features the characters Honoré Lechasseur and Emily Blandish from Daniel O'Mahony's Doctor Who novella The Cabinet of Light.
It is written by Claire Bott.

The novella is also available in a limited edition hardback, signed by the author

(The series is not formally connected to the Whoniverse.)

External links
 Telos Publishing - The Clockwork Woman

Time Hunter
2004 novels
Telos Publishing books